O'Connell High School may refer to:

Bishop Denis J. O'Connell High School — Arlington County, Virginia
John A. O'Connell High School of Technology — San Francisco, California
Walter G. O'Connell Copiague High School — Copiague, New York
O'Connell College Preparatory School — Galveston, Texas